Florida Gulf Coast may refer to:

 the portion of the Gulf Coast of the United States in the state of Florida
 Florida Gulf Coast University, in Fort Myers, Florida
 Florida Gulf Coast Eagles, athletic teams of the University